Albert Harrison (born 15 February 1904; date of death unknown) was an English footballer who played as a centre half.

Harrison started his career at Wigan Borough, making six Football League appearances for the club. He then spent a few years in non-league football before joining Second Division side Nottingham Forest in 1927. He scored five goals in 77 games for Forest, and was selected in the England XI squad for the FA's tour to South Africa in 1929. His performances attracted the attention of First Division club Leicester City, who signed him later that year. He played for the "Professionals" in the 1929 FA Charity Shield.

References

1904 births
Year of death missing
English footballers
Association football midfielders
Wigan Borough F.C. players
Atherton Collieries A.F.C. players
Chorley F.C. players
Nottingham Forest F.C. players
Leicester City F.C. players
Dundalk F.C. players
Drumcondra F.C. players
Wigan Athletic F.C. players
FC Lugano players
English Football League players